The Knightstown Academy is a historic school building located at Knightstown, Henry County, Indiana.  It was built as a Quaker Academy in 1876 and affiliated with the Society of Friends. The building is located north of the National Road (US 40) on Cary at Washington Street. The building was designed in Second Empire style. It has a mansard roof and twin four story towers that are topped by a telescope and a globe. After the building ceased to be used as an academy, it functioned for many years as the local public high school. It is now an apartment building. The attached gymnasium was used as the home court of the Hickory Huskers in the 1985 movie Hoosiers.

It was added to the National Register of Historic Places in 1976. It is located in Knightstown Historic District.

References

External links
Hoosier Gym

Historic American Buildings Survey in Indiana
School buildings on the National Register of Historic Places in Indiana
School buildings completed in 1877
Knightstown, Indiana
National Register of Historic Places in Henry County, Indiana
Buildings and structures in Henry County, Indiana
Historic district contributing properties in Indiana
Buildings with mansard roofs
1877 establishments in Indiana